Joseph Masters (1802 – 21 December 1873) was a New Zealand cooper, community leader, farmer, politician and writer. He was born in Derby, Derbyshire, England in 1802. Masterton is named after him.

References

1802 births
1873 deaths
New Zealand farmers
New Zealand writers
English emigrants to New Zealand
19th-century New Zealand politicians
People from Derby